Campo Grande is a municipality located in the Brazilian state of Alagoas.

References

Municipalities in Alagoas